Bacillaria is a diatom genus in the family Bacillariaceae.

Species

Bacillaria paradoxa Gmelin 1788      
Bacillaria paxillifer (O.F. Müller) Hendey (1951)

Lifecycle
This genus is photosynthetic, and reproduces sexually and asexually.

Description
Cells are elongated and motile, sliding along each other, in stacked colonies. Cells are rectangular in girdle view (when in colonies), and lanceolate in valve view. Raphe system is slightly keeled and runs from pole to pole. Two large plate-like chloroplasts are present, one near each end of the cell. The nucleus is located centrally. Cells are yellow-brown in colour. Fibulae are strong, and the valve surface is covered in transverse parallel structures called striae.

Space station
Three diatom species were sent to the International Space Station, together with the huge (6 mm length) diatoms of Antarctica and the exclusive colonial diatom, Bacillaria paradoxa. The cells of Bacillaria moved next to each other in partial but opposite synchrony by a microfluidics method.

Measurements
Length (apical axis): 70 - 200 μm

Width (trans-apical axis): 5 - 8 μm

Height (Pervalvar axis): 5 - 10 μm

Fibulae: 7 - 9 in 10 μm

Striae: 20 - 21 in 10 μm

Habitat
Benthic zone, marine and brackish/freshwater species, but is also commonly found in plankton.

References

 Phytoplankton Encyclopedia Project

Bacillariales
Articles containing video clips
Diatom genera